Franjo "Frane" Nonković (born 25 April 1939) is a retired Croatian water polo player. He was part of the Yugoslav teams that won a silver medal at the 1964 Olympics. Later in the 1960s–70s he became a successful water polo coach.

See also
 List of Olympic medalists in water polo (men)

References

External links
 

1939 births
Living people
Yugoslav male water polo players
Croatian male water polo players
Olympic water polo players of Yugoslavia
Water polo players at the 1964 Summer Olympics
Olympic silver medalists for Yugoslavia
Olympic medalists in water polo
Medalists at the 1964 Summer Olympics
Sportspeople from Rijeka
Mediterranean Games medalists in water polo
Mediterranean Games silver medalists for Yugoslavia
Competitors at the 1963 Mediterranean Games
Croatian water polo coaches